Sir George Augustus Pilkington (7 October 1848 – 28 January 1916) was an English doctor and Liberal politician.

Pilkington was born at Upwell, Cambridgeshire, as George Augustus Coombe, the son of R. G. Coombe a surgeon. He was educated privately and trained for medicine at Guy's Hospital, London. He became MRCS Eng and LSA in 1870. He practiced medicine in Southport from 1870 to 1884 when he was House Surgeon to Southport Infirmary, Medical Officer of the North Meols District, Ormskirk Union, Surgeon to the Royal Naval Artillery Volunteers, and Medical Officer to the Southport Convalescent Hospital and the Southport Infirmary. He married Mary Elizabeth Pilkington, daughter of James Pilkington, former MP for Blackburn in 1876 and changed his name to Pilkington on the death of his brother-in-law.

Pilkington was  Mayor of Southport from 1884 to 1885  In 1885, he was elected Member of Parliament for Southport but lost the seat in 1886.  He was a councillor and alderman on Lancashire County Council, Deputy Lieutenant, J.P., and Honorary Colonel of the 3rd Liverpool Volunteer Regiment until October 1902.

Pilkington was knighted in 1893. He won the seat at Southport again in a by-election in 1899, but lost it again at the 1900 general election. He was High Sheriff of Lancashire in 1911.

References

External links 
 

1848 births
1916 deaths
Members of Lancashire County Council
Liberal Party (UK) MPs for English constituencies
UK MPs 1885–1886
UK MPs 1895–1900
High Sheriffs of Lancashire
19th-century British medical doctors
Knights Bachelor
Politicians awarded knighthoods